(born 1943) is both a founder and vice president of the Japanese Society for History Textbook Reform (Tsukurukai, now headed by Nishio Kanji). He was once a professor at the Tokyo University and later moved to Takushoku University. He is now retired.

He was born in Iwamizawa, Hokkaido, and raised in Shibecha, Hokkaido. He is noted for his efforts at removing from Japanese textbooks accounts of wartime atrocities committed by Japan during the Second World War. He is considered to be a conservative and a nationalist, and has been quoted as saying that he "stand(s) for a viewpoint of history with an emphasis on national interest," and that the study of Japanese history is "subject to the ultimate moral imperative of whether or not it serves to inculcate a sense of pride in being Japanese." He has also said that to "write [a history] based only on verified historical truths makes...[it] insipid and dry. I had no choice but to write from my own imagination to a great extent."

In the early 1990s, Fujioka founded the Liberal View of History Study Group, which advocated "correcting history" by promoting a "positive view" of Japanese history, and removing all references to what he referred to as "dark history."  By 1995, he had created the Association for Advancement of Unbiased View of History (Jiyuu-Shugi-Shikan Kenkyuu-Kai) and the committee to Write New History Textbooks.  Among Japan's top ten bestsellers in 1997 were two volumes edited by Fujioka, History The Textbooks Do Not Teach and Shameful Modern History.

In late 1996, Fujioka and his followers had joined with others to form the Japanese Society for History Textbook Reform (Tsukurukai, now headed by Nishio Kanji).  This group authored The New History Textbook, which was one of eight junior high school history textbooks authorized by the Ministry of Education in April 2001.  In December 2000, a draft textbook circulated by the Society and shown on national television elicited criticism by many Japanese historians and teachers.

He is an assenter of the negationist film The Truth about Nanjing.

See also 
Nippon Kaigi

References

External links
 Examining the Japanese History Textbook Controversies; Kathleen Woods Masalski National Clearinghouse for U.S.-Japan Studies; East Asian Studies Center; Indiana University
 The Textbook Controversy; Charles Cummins Washington University webpage
  'Let's Stop Apologizing' A professor's battles outside the classroom Asiaweek magazine article
 The Politics of Amnesia: Reconstructing the Asia-Pacific War; Takeo Hymans Japan Watch article
 The 'Comfort Women' Controversy: History and Testimony;  Nozaki Yoshiko Z Magazine article
 Asia battles over war history: The legacy of the Pacific War looms over Tokyo's plans for the future; David McNeill and Mark Selden

1943 births
Living people
Hokkaido University alumni
Academic staff of the University of Tokyo
Japanese critics
Members of Nippon Kaigi
China–Japan relations
Nanjing Massacre deniers
Japanese educational theorists
People from Iwamizawa, Hokkaido
Historical negationism